Thymus may refer to:

Thymus, an organ
Thymus (plant) a genus of plants in the family Lamiaceae
Thymus (wasp), a genus of wasps in the family Eulophidae

Genus disambiguation pages